The Canadian Geophysical Union (French: Union géophysique canadienne) (CGU) began as a society dedicated to the scientific study of the solid earth and has evolved into one that is concerned with all aspects of the physical study of Earth and its space environment, including the Sun and solar system. To express this broader vision of the geophysical sciences, the Union has adopted a sectional structure that allows individual sections to function as semi-autonomous entities.

Goals
 Advance and promote the scientific study of Earth and its environment in space and to serve as a national focus for the geophysical sciences in Canada.
 Foster cooperation between the Canadian geophysical community and other national and international scientific organizations.
 Encourage communication through the organization and sponsorship of conferences and the publication of scientific results.
 Promote integration of geophysical knowledge with that of other sciences concerned with the improvement of life on Earth.

History
On October 24, 1945, the National Research Council (NRC) of Canada convened the first meeting of an Associate Committee to advise it on the needs of geophysics, with J.T.Wilson as the Chairman of the committee. In 1946, this committee was amalgamated with the Canadian committee for the International Union of Geodesy and Geophysics (IUGG) to form the Associate Committee of Geodesy and Geophysics (ACGG) of the NRC. Activities of geophysicists in Canada were coordinated by ACGG by forming a number of subcommittees. In 1974, the ACGG was replaced by a professional society called "The Canadian Geophysical Union, a joined Division of the Geological Association of Canada (GAC) and of the Canadian Association of Physicists (CAP)", and with J.T.Wilson as its first president. The Canadian Geophysical Union became an independent organization in 1988, but today geophysicists still can join CGU by joining CAP or the Geophysics Division of GAC. In 1993, the CGU formed a Hydrology Section. Now with about 500 members, CGU serves as the national focus for geophysical sciences.

Activities
To promote scientific communication, the CGU organizes Annual Meetings, topical conferences and workshops. To recognize outstanding scientific achievement and contributions to the Canadian geophysical sciences, the CGU offers various awards ranging from Best Student Paper awards to the J. Tuzo Wilson Medal, honouring Canada's premier geophysicist and first medal recipient. To communicate exciting research results to the university community and the general public, the CGU sponsors a nationwide Distinguished Lecturer Series and facilitates other forms of public exposure of science. To strengthen the geophysical sciences in Canada and Canadian science in general, the CGU provides representation on the Canadian Geosciences Council and the Canadian National Committee for the International Union of Geodesy and Geophysics.

See also
List of geoscience organizations
National Geographic Society

External links
CGU Official Website

Earth sciences societies
Geophysics societies
Geology societies
Learned societies
Learned societies of Canada
Scientific societies based in Canada
Scientific organizations based in Canada
Scientific organizations established in 1974